The vice president of Paraguay is the person with the second highest position in the executive branch of the Paraguayan government, after the president of Paraguay. The position of vice president was created with the Constitution of 1844, although it was the title given to ex officio members temporarily replacing the elected president in case of death or absence, and was not a position elected alongside the president.

The Constitution of 1870 established the position with a permanent character, requiring election alongside the president and assigning to it the presidency of the National Congress and the one of the Senate.

The position disappeared between 1940 and 1993, as the Constitutions of 1940 and 1967 abolished it. Only in 1992, with the new National Constitution, the position of vice president was reinstalled within the political institutional scheme of Paraguay.

The vice president serves a five-year term, running on the same ticket as the president. He is not eligible for reelection. A vice president may run for president, provided that he leaves office at least six months before election day.

List of vice presidents of Paraguay

As acting president (1844–1870)

As permanent position (1870–present)

See also
List of current vice presidents

References

External links 
 Galería de Vicepresidentes
 Vicepresidency of the Republic of Paraguay 
 Presidency of the Republic of Paraguay - The Vicepresident 

Government of Paraguay
Paraguay
1844 establishments in Paraguay